Joe Cutler (born London, 17th December 1968) is a British composer who grew up in Neasden and studied music at the Universities of Huddersfield and Durham, before receiving a Polish Government Scholarship to study at the Chopin Academy of Music in Warsaw, Poland. He has taught composition at the Royal Birmingham Conservatoire since 2000, and since 2005 he has been the Head of Composition there. In 2015 he was made Professor of Composition. He is also the co-founder of the instrumental ensemble Noszferatu.

Influence
During the late 1980s and early 1990s, Cutler, like many of his generation, including Americans composers Michael Gordon and David Lang, and British composer Steve Martland, was influenced by the minimalist music of Louis Andriessen. Like Andriessen, Cutler rejected the atonal inheritance of Arnold Schoenberg in favour of the more rhythmically driving music of Igor Stravinsky. In these early works, Cutler showed influences ranging from Minimalism and Andriessen to 1980s avant-garde modernism and even the rhythmic aspects of the New Complexity movement. This is seen in such works as Epitaph for Nebula (1989) and Blast! (1992), where atonality and complicated driving rhythms preside.

Works
During the 1990s, as Cutler's mature style developed, the complicated rhythms were gradually replaced with simpler, but still motoric, jazz inspired rhythms whilst the atonal element lost ground to allusions to Eastern-European modality and jazz. This is seen in one of his most popular works, Sal's Sax (1996), written for the De Ereprijs Ensemble. In more recent years, Cutler has developed a more lyrical side along with his influences from postminimalism, which led to works such as Awakenings (1998), Sikorski (2005) and Hawaii Hawaii Hawaii (2019). 

Joe Cutler received a Special Mention at the 1997 Gaudeamus Music Week, and 2nd Prize in the 2000 Toru Takemitsu Award. In 2008, Cutler won the Chamber Music Category in the BBC Composer Awards with his piece, 'Folk Music'. In 2016, he also received a British Composer Award in the Jazz Category for ‘Karembeu’s Guide to the Complete Defensive Midfielder’. In 2023 he was shortlisted for a Royal Philharmonic Society Award in the Large Scale Work Category for ‘Concerto Grosso’.

In 2010, Cutler was one of twenty composers commissioned to write a piece for the London 2012 Olympics.

Recordings

Cutler has released four albums of his work. Bartlebooth was released on NMC in 2008 and was one of Gramophone’s Top 20 releases of 2008. Boogie Nights was released in 2012 on Birmingham Record Company. Elsewhereness was released on NMC Recordings in 2018, reaching number 10 in the Classical Specialist Charts. His most recent release is Hawaii Hawaii Hawaii which was released on Birmingham Record Company in 2020

Selected works
Epitaph for Nebula (1989), for mixed ensemble
Blast! (1992), for clarinet, violin, cello and piano
Gaia (1993), for viola solo
Shamen (1994), for trombone solo
Sal's Sax (1996), for mixed ensemble
Awakenings (1998), for large orchestra
Urban Myths (1999), for saxophone and piano
Five Mobiles after Alexander Calder (2000), for soprano saxophone (or clarinet), viola and piano
Without Fear of Vertigo (2001), for mixed ensemble
Music for Cello and Strings (2005), for cello and string orchestra
In Praise of Dreams (2005), for soprano and piano
Sikorski (2005), for mixed ensemble
Folk Music (2007), for string quartet
Music for Sunflowers (2009), for viola and string orchestra
Ping! (2012), for string quartet and four table tennis players
Boogie Nights (2012), for mixed ensemble and mechanical organ
Karembeu’s Guide to the Complete Defensive Midfielder (2015), for improvising duo and mixed ensemble
McNulty (2016), for piano trio 
Elsewhereness (2018), for symphony orchestra
Hawaii Hawaii Hawaii (2019), for saxophone and orchestra
Just Passing Through (2020), for solo piano and large ensemble 
Concerto Grosso (2022), for solo ensemble and string orchestra/timpani
Painted Time (2023), for piano trio

References
 BMIC profile
 Scotsman article SCO premiere of Cinnamon Street
 "Tinkle, tinkle little star" The Guardian

External links
 Official site
 Cutler at the British Composers Project
 Orchestra of the Swan (auto?)biography
 NMC profile
 Birmingham Conservatoire profile

1968 births
Living people
British classical composers
British male classical composers
20th-century classical composers
21st-century classical composers
20th-century British composers
21st-century British composers
20th-century British male musicians
21st-century British male musicians